The Ministry of Border Affairs (abbreviated MBA), formerly Ministry of Progress of Border Areas, National Races and Development Affairs is a ministry in the Government of Myanmar which is responsible for the development of border areas and national races. According to the Constitution of Myanmar, the Union Minister of Border Affairs is a member of National Defence and Security Council.

Departments 
Union Minister Office 
Department for Development for Border Areas and National Races 
Education and Training Department

List of Union Ministers (Mar 2011 - Present)
 Thein Htay (30 March 2011 – 13 February 2013)
 Thet Naing Win (February 2013 – 13 August 2015)
 Kyaw Swe (13 August 2015 – 30 March 2016)
 Ye Aung (30 March 2016 – 1 February 2021)
 Tun Tun Naung (1 February 2021 – present)

References

External links 
 Ministry of Border Affairs
 Ministry of Border Affairs at YouTube
 Ministry of Border Affairs at Facebook

BorderAffairs
Myanmar